Functional ultrasound imaging (fUS) is a medical ultrasound imaging technique of detecting or measuring changes in neural activities or metabolism, for example, the loci of brain activity, typically through measuring blood flow or hemodynamic changes. The method can be seen as an extension of Doppler imaging.

Background 

Brain activation can either be directly measured by imaging electrical activity of neurons using voltage sensitive dyes, calcium imaging, electroencephalography, or magnetoencephalography, or indirectly by detecting hemodynamic changes in blood flow in the neurovascular systems through functional magnetic resonance imaging (fMRI), positron emission tomography (PET), Functional near-infrared spectroscopy (fNIRS),  or Doppler ultrasonography  )...

Optical based methods generally provide the highest spatial and temporal resolutions; however, due to scattering, they are intrinsically limited to the investigation of the cortex. Thus, they are often used on animal models after partially removing or thinning the skull to allow for the light to penetrate into tissue. fMRI and PET, which measure the blood-oxygen level dependent (BOLD) signal, were the only techniques capable of imaging brain activation in depth. BOLD signal increases when neuronal activation exceeds oxygen consumption, where blood flow increases significantly. In fact, in-depth imaging of cerebral hemodynamic responses by fMRI, being noninvasive, paved the way for major discoveries in neurosciences in the early stage, and is applicable on humans. However, fMRI also suffers limitations. First, the cost and size of MR machines can be prohibitive. Also, spatially resolved fMRI is achieved at the expense of a substantial drop in temporal resolution and/or SNR. As a result, the imaging of transient events such as epilepsy is particularly challenging. Finally, fMRI is not appropriate for all clinical applications. For example, fMRI is rarely performed on infants because of specific issues concerning infant sedation.

Like fMRI, Doppler based functional ultrasound approach are based on the neurovascular coupling and are thus limited by the spatiotemporal features of neurovascular coupling as they measure cerebral blood volume (CBV) changes. CBV is a pertinent parameter for functional imaging that is already used by other modalities such as intrinsic optical imaging or CBV-weighted fMRI. The spatiotemporal extent of CBV response was extensively studied. The spatial resolution of sensory-evoked CBV response can go down to cortical column (~100 µm). Temporally, the CBV impulse response function was measured to typically start at ~0.3 s and peak at ~1 s in response to ultrashort stimuli (300µs), which is much slower than the underlying electrical activity.

Conventional Doppler based functional imaging approaches 

Hemodynamic changes in the brain are often used as a surrogate indicator of neuronal activity to map the loci of brain activity. Major part of the hemodynamic response occurs in small vessels; however, conventional Doppler ultrasound is not sensitive enough to detect the blood flow in such small vessels.

Functional Transcranial Doppler (fTCD) 
Ultrasound Doppler imaging can be used to obtain basic functional measurements of brain activity using blood flow. In functional transcranial Doppler sonography, a low frequency (1-3 MHz) transducer is used through the temporal bone window with a conventional pulse Doppler mode to estimate blood flow at a single focal location. The temporal profile of blood velocity is usually acquired in main large arteries such as the middle cerebral artery (MCA). The peak velocity is compared between rest and task conditions or between right and left sides when studying lateralization.

Power Doppler 
Power Doppler is a Doppler sequence that measures the ultrasonic energy backscattered from red blood cells in each pixel of the image. It provides no information on blood velocity but is proportional to blood volume within the pixel. However, conventional power Doppler imaging lacks sensitivity to detect small arterioles/venules and thus is unable to provide local neurofunctional information through neurovascular coupling.

Ultrasensitive Doppler and functional ultrasound imaging (fUS) 
Functional ultrasound imaging was pioneered at ESPCI by Mickael Tanter's team following work on ultrafast imaging and ultrafast Doppler.

Ultrasensitive Doppler principle 

Ultrasensitive Doppler relies on ultrafast imaging scanners able to acquire images at thousands of frames per second, thus boosting the power Doppler SNR without any contrast agents. Instead of the line by line acquisition of conventional ultrasound devices, ultra-fast ultrasound takes advantage of successive tilted plane wave transmissions that afterward coherently compounded to form images at high frame rates.
Coherent Compound Beamforming consists of the recombination of backscattered echoes from different illuminations achieved on the acoustic pressure field with various angles (as opposed to the acoustic intensity for the incoherent case). All images are added coherently to obtain a final compounded image. This very addition is produced without taking the envelope of the beamformed signals or any other nonlinear procedure to ensure a coherent addition. As a result, coherent adding of several echo waves leads to cancellation of out-of-phase waveforms, narrowing the point spread function (PSF), and thus increasing spatial resolution.
A theoretical model demonstrates that the gain in sensitivity of the ultrasensitive Doppler method is due to the combination of the high signal-to-noise ratio (SNR) of the gray scale images, due to the synthetic compounding of backscattered echoes and the extensive signal samples averaging due to the high temporal resolution of ultrafast frame rates.
The sensitivity was recently further improved using multiple plane wave transmissions and advanced spatiotemporal clutter filters for better discrimination between low blood flow and tissue motion. 
Ultrasound researchers have been using ultrafast imaging research platforms with parallel acquisition of channels and custom sequences programming to investigate ultrasensitive Doppler/fUS modalities. A custom real-time high-performance GPU beamforming code with a high data transfer rate (several GBytes per second) must then be implemented to perform imaging at high frame rate. Acquisitions can also typically easily provide gigabytes of data depending on acquisition duration.

Ultrasensitive Doppler has a typical 50-200 µm spatial resolution depending on the ultrasound frequency used. It features a temporal resolution in the tens of milliseconds, can image the full depth of the brain and can provide 3D angiography.

functional Ultrasound imaging 

This signal boost enables the sensitivity required to map subtle blood variations in small arterioles (down to 1mm/s) related to neuronal activity. 
By applying an external stimulus such as a sensory, auditory or visual stimulation, it is then possible to construct a map of brain activation from the ultrasensitive Doppler movie.

fUS measures indirectly cerebral blood volume which provides an effect size close to 20% and as such is quite more sensitive than fMRI whose BOLD response is typically only a couple of percents.
Correlation maps or statistical parametric maps can be constructed to highlight the activated areas. 
fUS has been shown to have a spatial resolution on the order 100 micrometers at 15 MHz in ferrets and is sensitive enough to perform single trial detection in awake primates.
Other fMRI-like modalities such as functional connectivity can also be implemented.

Commercial scanners with specialized hardware and software are enabling fUS to rapidly expand behind ultrasound research labs to the neuroscience community.

4D functional ultrasound imaging 
Some researchers conducted 4D functional ultrasound imaging of whole-brain activity in rodents. Currently, two different technological solutions are proposed for the acquisition of 3D and 4D fUS data, each with its own advantages and drawbacks.
The first is a tomographic approach based on motorized translation of linear probes. This approach proved to be a successful method for several applications such as 3D retinotopic mapping in the rodent brain and 3D tonotopic mapping of the auditory system in ferrets.
The second approach relies on high frequency 2D matrix array transducer technology coupled with a high channel count electronic system for fast 3D imaging. To counterbalance the intrinsically poor sensitivity of matrix elements, they devised a 3D multiplane-wave scheme with 3D spatiotemporal encoding of transmit signals using Hadamard coefficients. For each transmission, the backscattered signals containing mixed echoes from the different plane waves are decoded using the summation of echoes from successive receptions with appropriate Hadamard coefficients. This summation enables the synthetic building of echoes from a virtual individual plane wave transmission with a higher amplitude. Finally, they perform coherent compounding beamforming of decoded echoes to produce 3D ultrasonic images and apply a spatiotemporal clutter filter separating blood flow from tissue motion to compute a power Doppler volume, which is proportional to the cerebral blood volume.

Features

Advantages 

• High SNR with large effect size >15% of relative CBV increase compared to ~1% in BOLD fMRI

• High spatial resolution (100 micrometers at 15 MHz for preclinical use),

• Compatibility with other techniques commonly used by physiologists, in particular electrophysiological recordings or optogenetics.

• Can be used in awake animals, headfixed or mobile.

• Inexpensive and more practical (smaller machine, transportable), compared with fMRI.

• Requires no calibration and little setup time. Easy to set up.

• Enabling study of the subcortical structures makes in-depth imaging prospective compared with optical techniques

• Can be used through the transfontanellar window in neonates

• Transcranial in mice

• 3D scans possible using motors or a 2D matrix array

Drawbacks 
• Cannot image through the skull (except mice): can be solved by techniques of thinned-skull already developed for chronical optical imaging, the use of TPX window or the use contrast agents to increase blood echogenicity to allow imaging through the skull.

• Capillary blood flow is on the order of 0.5 mm/s, which could be filtered out by HPF and thus could not be detected although advanced spatiotemporal clutter filters have been proposed.

• 2D matrix array technology for 3D fUS imaging is still in research and suffers some sensitivity limitations. 
3D scans using motors have typical lower temporal resolution than equivalent 2D scans.

Applications 
Functional ultrasound imaging has a wide range of applications in research and in clinical practice.

Preclinical applications 

fUS can benefit in monitoring cerebral function in the whole brain which is important to understanding how the brain works on a large scale under normal or pathological conditions. The ability to image cerebral blood volume at high spatiotemporal resolution and with high sensitivity using fUS could be of great interest for applications in which fMRI reaches its limits, such as imaging of epileptic-induced changes in blood volume. fUS can be applied for chronic studies in animal models through a thinned-skull or smaller cranial window or directly through the skull in mice.

Brain activity mapping 
Tonotopics or retinotopics maps can be constructed by mapping the response of frequency-varying sounds or moving visual targets.

functional connectivity / resting state 
When no stimulus is applied, fUS can be used to study functional connectivity during resting state. The method has been demonstrated in rats and awake mice  and can be used for pharmacological studies when testing drugs. Seed-based maps, independent component analysis of resting states modes or functional connectivity matrix between atlas-based regions of interests can be constructed with high resolution.

awake fUS imaging 
Using dedicated ultralight probes, it is possible to perform freely-moving experiments in rats or mice. The size of the probes and electromagnetic-compatibility of fUS means it can also be used easily on head-fixed setups for mice or in electrophysiology chambers in primate.

Clinical applications

Neonates 
Thanks to its portability, fUS has also been used in clinics in awake neonates. Functional ultrasound imaging can be applied to neonatal brain imaging in a non-invasive manner through the fontanel window. Ultrasound is usually performed in this case, which means that the current procedures does not have to be changed. High quality angiographic images could help diagnose vascular diseases such as perinatal ischemia or ventricular hemorrhage.

Adults / intraoperative 
For adults, this method can be used during neurosurgery to guide the surgeon through the vasculature and to monitor the patient's brain function prior to tumor resection

See also 

 functional magnetic resonance imaging (fMRI)
 Functional neuroimaging

References 

Ultrasound
Magnetic resonance imaging